is a Japanese manga series written and illustrated by Satomi U. It was serialized in Square Enix's Young Gangan from March 2016 to March 2021, and published in eleven volumes.

Plot
28-year-old Shuuko Yakumo is aimlessly living day-to-day life since she lost her husband. She's content to live out her days in peace until a 15-year-old high school student named Shohei Yamato moves next door. Curious about her new neighbor, she soon finds that he lives alone and works himself to the bone as the only scholarship student for his school's baseball team. Not only that, but he's been living off nothing but convenience store food.

Worried for his health, Yakumo invites Yamato to eat dinner at her place from now on so he can perform his best. But after extending this invitation, she soon finds that the high schooler possesses a monstrous appetite, and she has to get creative to keep up with his dietary needs. All the while, Yamato's ability to pack away food brings back memories of Yakumo's husband.

And so begins the story of a lonely widow rediscovering her passion for cooking to feed a very hungry high schooler.

Publication
The series is written and illustrated by Satomi U. It started serialization in Young Gangan on March 4, 2016. The series ended in Young Gangan on March 19, 2021. The series was collected into eleven tankōbon volumes. An autograph session with the author was held to commemorate the release of the final volume.

In November 2019, Square Enix announced they would publish the manga in English starting in October 2020. However, it was later delayed to February 2021 due to the COVID-19 pandemic.

Volume list

Reception
Sean Gaffney from Manga Bookshelf praised the first volume, calling it "sweet". Rebecca Silverman from Anime News Network praised the plot and characters, while criticizing the artwork in some frames. Like Gaffney, Demelza from Anime UK News also called the series "sweet".

References

External links
 

Baseball in anime and manga
Cooking in anime and manga
Gangan Comics manga
Romantic comedy anime and manga
Seinen manga
Slice of life anime and manga